The 1981 NAIA Division II football season, as part of the 1981 college football season in the United States and the 26th season of college football sponsored by the NAIA, was the 21st season of play of the NAIA's lower division for football.

The season was played from August to November 1981 and culminated in the 1981 NAIA Division II Football National Championship, played at Louis Calder Stadium in Sherman, Texas. 

Austin and tied in the championship game, 24–24, and were declared co-national champions. It was Austin's first NAIA national title and Concordia's third.

Conference changes
 This is the final season that the Minnesota Intercollegiate Athletic Conference is officially recognized as an NAIA football conferences. The MIAC, and it nine members from Minnesota, became an NCAA Division III conference for the 1982 season, where the league continues to sponsor football.

Conference standings

Conference champions

Postseason

See also
 1981 NAIA Division I football season
 1981 NCAA Division I-A football season
 1981 NCAA Division I-AA football season
 1981 NCAA Division II football season
 1981 NCAA Division III football season

References

 
NAIA Football National Championship